Cheskers is a variant of checkers and chess invented by Solomon Golomb in 1948.

Rules

Pieces
 Pawns move as pieces in checkers: they move, without taking, one square diagonally forward, but take by jumping two squares diagonally forward over an enemy piece to an empty square, thereby removing the enemy piece. Capturing of one or more pieces is mandatory.
 Kings moves as a promoted checkers piece: this is the same type of move as a pawn in this game, but now the king can move and take also diagonally backwards. Capturing of one or more pieces is mandatory.
 The bishop moves and takes exactly as in normal chess. Capturing is not mandatory.
 The camel (Golomb called it the cook) has a kind of extended knight's move: it goes one diagonal and two straight. With this move, it can jump over other pieces (like a knight jumps), but the camel takes by moving to the square on which the enemy piece is located. Capturing is not mandatory.

Promotion

When a pawn reaches the last row of the board its move is ended, and the pawn can promote to king, bishop or camel.

Starting position

 White: Kings c1, e1; Bishop a1; Camel g1; pawns a3, b2, c3, d2, e3, f2, g3, h2.
 Black: Kings d8, f8, Bishop h8; Camel b8; pawns a7, b6, c7, d6, e7, f6, g7, h6.

Black moves first.

Victory conditions

The player that captures all opponent's kings wins the game. Also, a player that is stalemated (cannot move) loses the game.

References

Chess variants
Draughts variants
1948 in chess
Board games introduced in 1948